Hardeman may refer to:

Hardeman (surname)
Hardeman County (disambiguation), two counties in the United States
Hardeman, Santa Cruz, town in Bolivia
Hardeman, Missouri, a community in the United States